Courtland Sutton (born October 10, 1995) is an American football wide receiver for the Denver Broncos of the National Football League (NFL). He played college football at SMU, and was selected by the Broncos in the second round of the 2018 NFL Draft.

Early years
Sutton attended Brenham High School in Brenham, Texas, where he played high school football. As a senior, he was named first-team All-District as a tight end and second-team as a safety. Brenham finished the 2013 season with a 14–2 record, losing to Aledo in the UIL 4A Division 2 state championship game. Regarded a three-star prospect by ESPN, Sutton committed to Southern Methodist University over offers from BYU, Colorado and Rice.

College career
Sutton played in two games as a true freshman at SMU in 2014, before suffering an injury and taking a medical redshirt. As a redshirt freshman in 2015, he started all 12 games, recording 49 receptions for 862 yards and nine touchdowns. After the season, he played in three games for SMU's basketball team. As a sophomore in 2016, Sutton started all 12 games and had 76 receptions for 1,246 yards and 10 touchdowns. Sutton considered entering the 2017 NFL Draft, but instead, he decided to return to college for his redshirt junior year. On December 22, 2017, Sutton officially declared that he would enter the 2018 NFL Draft after completing his junior year.

Collegiate statistics

Professional career

The Denver Broncos selected Sutton in the second round (40th overall) of the 2018 NFL Draft. He was the third wide receiver selected that year.

2018
Sutton made his NFL debut with two receptions for 45 yards in the Broncos' season-opening 27–24 victory over the Seattle Seahawks. In Week 5, against the New York Jets, he scored his first professional touchdown. He finished his rookie season with 42 receptions for 704 yards and four touchdowns.

2019

In Week 1 against the Oakland Raiders on Monday Night Football, Sutton caught seven passes for 120 yards in the 24–16 loss. In Week 4 against the Jacksonville Jaguars, Sutton caught six passes for 62 yards and two touchdowns in the 26–24 loss. In Week 5 against the Los Angeles Chargers, Sutton caught four passes for 92 yards, including a 70-yard receiving touchdown, as the Broncos won their first game of the season by a score of 20–13. In Week 11 against the Minnesota Vikings, Sutton caught five passes for 113 yards in the 27–23 loss In Week 13 against the Los Angeles Chargers, Sutton caught four passes for 74 yards, and rookie quarterback Drew Lock's first two touchdown passes in the NFL, during the 23-20 victory. Overall, in the 2019 season, Sutton recorded 72 receptions for 1,112 receiving yards and six receiving touchdowns.

On January 15, Sutton was moved into the Pro Bowl roster as an alternate, replacing the injured DeAndre Hopkins, who opted to not play in the game due to a rib injury suffered in a Divisional Round playoff game versus the Kansas City Chiefs. It was Sutton's first Pro Bowl selection, and with the selection, Sutton became the fastest Broncos wide receiver to earn a Pro Bowl nod, accomplishing it in just his second season in the NFL, breaking Demaryius Thomas's record.

2020
After missing Week 1 with a shoulder injury, Sutton made his 2020 debut the following week against the Pittsburgh Steelers. During the game, Sutton caught three passes for 66 yards before exiting the game with a knee injury. The next day, an MRI confirmed that Sutton suffered a torn ACL and he was placed on season-ending injured reserve on September 22, 2020.

2021
On November 22, 2021, Sutton signed a four-year $60.8 million contract extension with the Broncos through the 2025 season. In Week 2, against the Jacksonville Jaguars, he had nine receptions for 159 receiving yards in the 23–13 victory. In Week 5, against the Pittsburgh Steelers, he had seven receptions for 12 receiving yards and one receiving touchdown in the 27–19 loss. Sutton finished the season with 58 receptions for 776 yards and two touchdowns.

2022
In Week 2, against the Houston Texans, Sutton had seven receptions for 122 receiving yards in the 16–9 victory. He played in 15 games in the 2022 season. He finished with 64 receptions for 829 receiving yards and two receiving touchdowns.

NFL career statistics

References

External links

SMU Mustangs bio
Denver Broncos bio

1995 births
Living people
American Conference Pro Bowl players
American football wide receivers
American men's basketball players
Denver Broncos players
People from Brenham, Texas
Players of American football from Texas
SMU Mustangs football players
SMU Mustangs men's basketball players
Ed Block Courage Award recipients